Rana Kharkongor (1951/1952 – 21 May 2021) was a Khasi-Indian singer, songwriter and video director. He was well known for his release "Tiew Kulab" and was a part of the album Jingkieng Ksiar.

Biography
Kharkongor started singing in the 1970s and throughout his career received 'Grade A' by All India Radio, and was featured on National DD Metro POP TIME Programme in the year 1986. He has produced twenty-seven albums which were mostly recorded in Calcutta and has 29 albums to his credit.

In October 2013, Kharkongor was involved in the protest against bandhs by giving a performance alongside artist such as Lou Majaw. A few years later he performed on 2 April 2016 at the Monolith Festival.

Kharkongor was a victim of COVID-19. He died at the age of 69 on Friday morning 21 May 2021.

Discography 
 Jingkieng Ksiar volume 1, 2 and 3 (1983)
 Best of Jingkieng Ksiar (1984)
 Balei ia nga (1985)
 Lashai dei ka Mynta (1986)
 Special Collection (1986)
 The Pioneer (1987)
 Nga ju kynmaw (1990)
 Top Hits of Jingkieng Ksiar (1991)
 Ngam long marwei (1993)
 Ngan jam shakhmat (1995)
 Star of 22 Hits (1995)
 24 Non Stop (1995)
 LTC Hikai ia u A (1996)
 Junom (1996)
 LTC Nongpyniap (1997)
 Ummat u Tirot Sing (1997)
 Golden Sentimental Tang Sur Jingrwai (2003)
 Rock Collection (2004)
 Rangli (2005)
 Adona (2004)

References 

1940s births
2021 deaths
20th-century Indian male singers
20th-century Indian singers
Khasi people
People from Shillong
Year of birth uncertain
Deaths from the COVID-19 pandemic in India
21st-century Indian male singers
21st-century Indian singers